John Trenchard (1662 – 17 December 1723) was an English writer and Commonwealthman.

Life
Trenchard belonged to the same Dorset family as the Secretary of State Sir John Trenchard. He was educated at Trinity College, Dublin, and became a lawyer. From 1722 until his death Trenchard was also a member of Parliament for Taunton. He died on 17 December 1723.

Works
As he inherited considerable wealth, Trenchard was able to devote the greater part of his life to writing on political subjects, his approach being that of a Whig and an opponent of the High Church party. With Walter Moyle he wrote An Argument, Shewing that a Standing Army is Inconsistent with a Free Government (1697) and A Short History of Standing Armies in England (1698 and 1731). He developed anticlerical lines of argument in The Natural History of Superstition (1709), and The Independent Whig, a weekly periodical published in 1720–21 with Thomas Gordon. From 1720 to 1723, Trenchard, again with Thomas Gordon, wrote a series of 144 weekly essays entitled Cato's Letters, condemning corruption and lack of morality within the British political system and warning against tyranny. The essays were published as Essays on Liberty, Civil and Religious, first in the London Journal and then in the British Journal. These essays became a cornerstone of the Commonwealthmen tradition.

See also
Republicanism
Liberalism
Contributions to liberal theory

References

Further reading
 Jonathan Harris, 'The Grecian coffee house and political debate in London, 1688–1714', The London Journal 25 (2000), 1–13
 Margaret C. Jacob, The Radical Enlightenment: Pantheists, Freemasons and Republicans (London, 1981)
 Caroline Robbins, The Eighteenth Century Commonwealthman. Studies in the Transmission, Development and Circumstance of English Liberal Thought from the Restoration of Charles II until the War with the Thirteen Colonies (Cambridge MA, 1959)
 Lois G. Schwoerer, 'No Standing Armies!' The Antiarmy Ideology in Seventeenth-Century England (Baltimore and London, 1974)
 Lois G. Schwoerer, 'The Literature of the Standing Army Controversy', Huntington Library Quarterly, 28 (1965), 189–212

External links

John Trenchard at the Online Library of Liberty

1662 births
1723 deaths
Alumni of Trinity College Dublin
Members of the Parliament of Great Britain for English constituencies
Whig (British political party) MPs
British MPs 1722–1727